Lucien Coatsworth Gause (December 25, 1836 – November 5, 1880) was an American nineteenth-century politician and lawyer from Arkansas.

Biography
Born near Wilmington, North Carolina, Gause moved to Lauderdale County, Tennessee and studied under a private tutor. He graduated from the University of Virginia, studied law, graduated from Cumberland University and was admitted to the bar, commencing practice in Jacksonport, Arkansas in 1859.

At the outbreak of the Civil War, he entered the Confederate Army as a lieutenant and was later promoted to colonel. Gause resumed practicing law in Jacksonport in 1865, was a member of the Arkansas House of Representatives in 1866 and was a commissioner to represent the State of Arkansas in Washington, D.C. He unsuccessfully contested the election of Asa Hodges as a Democrat to the United States House of Representatives in 1873 before successfully being elected to the House of Representatives in 1874, serving from 1875 to 1879, not being a candidate for renomination in 1878. Afterwards, Gause resumed practicing law until his death in Jacksonport, Arkansas on November 5, 1880. He was interred in a private cemetery near Jacksonport.

References

External links
 Retrieved on 2008-02-13

1836 births
1880 deaths
Democratic Party members of the Arkansas House of Representatives
Arkansas lawyers
Confederate States Army officers
University of Virginia alumni
Cumberland University alumni
Politicians from Wilmington, North Carolina
People from Lauderdale County, Tennessee
People of Arkansas in the American Civil War
Democratic Party members of the United States House of Representatives from Arkansas
19th-century American politicians
19th-century American lawyers